Sihu is a town in Pizhou, Jiangsu province, China. , it has 17 villages under its administration: 
Sihu Village
Gaobanqiao Village
Duzhuang Village
Guqiao Village
Zhaobu Village
Xiadun Village
Zhaojia Village
Lijia Village
Daokou Village
Zhuyuan Village
Baimasi Village
Fenghuangzhuang Village
Gouya Village
Gangzi Village
Beitaoyuan Village
Shiyang Village
Dongtang Village

See also 
 List of township-level divisions of Jiangsu

References 

Township-level divisions of Jiangsu
Pizhou